Tien Peng  (born 1945) is a Chinese actor and director who has been active in Taiwan cinema and Hong Kong cinema.  His name also appears as Tin Peng.

Filmography
Filmography as actor, unless otherwise noted.

 The Desperate Prodigal (1985). Director, Actor 	
 Majestic Thunderbolt (1985)
 Virago (1984)
 Three Famous Constables (1983)
 Demon Fighter (1982)
 Escape To Freedom (1982)
 Jade Dagger Ninja (1982)
 Lone Ninja Warrior (1982)
 Dark Lady Of Kung Fu (1981)	
 Eagle's Claw And Butterfly Palm (1981)
 Ninja Swords Of Death (1981)
 Jade Fox (1980)
 The Legend of Broken Sword (1980)
 Mask Of Vengeance (1980)
 Silver Spear (1980). Director, Actor 	
 Veiling Of Hidden Sword (1980)
 Witty Hand, Witty Sword (1980)
 Heroes In The Late Ming Dynasty (1979)
 The Samurai (1979)
 Scorching Sun, Fierce Winds, Wild Fire (1979)
 Wanderer With Nimble Knife (1979)
 Bruce Li's Magnum Fist (1978)
 The Flower, The Killer (1978)
 The Lawman (1978)
 The Shaolin Kids (1978)
 Assassin (1977)
 Imperial Sword (1977)
 Legend Of All Men Are Brothers (1977). Director, Actor 	
 Lost Swordship (1977)
 Pai Yu Ching (1977)
 18 Bronzemen (1976)
 Return Of The 18 Bronzemen (1976). Cameo
 Majesty Cat (1975). Director, Actor 	
 Strange Odyssey (1975)
 Tigers At Top (1975) 	
 The Notorious Bandit (1974). Director, Writer, Actor 	
 The Virgin Mart (1974)
 Murder Masters Of Kung Fu (1973)
 Big Fight, The (1972)
 Bronze Head And Steel Arm (1972)
 Chaochow Guy (1972)
 A Girl Fighter (1972)
 Tough Duel (1972)
 Cruel Killer (1971)	
 Duel of Karate aka. To Subdue Evil (1971)
 The Ghost Hill (1971)
 The Lost Romance (1971)
 Rider Of Revenge (1971)
 A Touch of Zen (1971) - Ouyang Nian
 The Bravest Revenge (1970)
 The Melody Of Love (1969)
 Swordsman Of All Swordsmen (1968)
 Dragon Gate Inn (1967)

Awards
Tien Peng received a Special Award at the 7th Golden Horse Awards in 1969.

References

External links

 Tien Peng at Hong Kong Cinemagic

20th-century Chinese male actors
1945 births
Living people